Diane Mavis Schoemperlen (born July 9, 1954) is a Canadian novelist and short story writer.

Early life and education
Schoemperlen was born in Thunder Bay, Ontario, and educated at Lakehead University.

Career

Schoemperlen's first novel, In the Language of Love, was published in 1994; it is composed of one hundred chapters, each one based on one of the one hundred words in the Standard Word Association Test, which was used to measure sanity. There are chapters titled "Table," "Slow," "Cabbage," and "Scissors."   New York Times reviewer Jay Parini pronounced Schoemperlen "a novelist of real promise".

Schoemperlen's 1998 book of short stories, Forms of Devotion, won the Governor General's Award. In her second novel, Our Lady of the Lost and Found (2001), the narrator is visited by the Virgin Mary, and the two women spend one week cooking, cleaning, and shopping.

Schoemperlen's 2017 book, This is Not My Life, tells of her love for a prison inmate.

Bibliography

 Double Exposures, 1984
 Frogs & Other Stories, 1986
 Hockey Night in Canada, 1987
 The Man of My Dreams, 1990
 Hockey Night in Canada & Other Stories, 1991
 In the Language of Love: A Novel in 100 Chapters, 1994
 Forms of Devotion, 1998
 Our Lady of the Lost and Found, 2001
 Red Plaid Shirt, 2002
 Names of the Dead : An Elegy for the Victims of September 11, 2004
 At a Loss for Words, 2008
 By the Book: Stories and Pictures, 2014
 This Is Not My Life: A Memoir of Love, Prison, and Other Complications, 2016
 First Things First, 2016

Awards and nominations

 1990 Governor General's Award for English Fiction: The Man of My Dreams (nominee)
 1994 Books in Canada First Novel Award: In the Language of Love (nominee)
 1998 Governor General's Award for English Fiction: Forms of Devotion (winner)
 2007 Marian Engel Award (winner)
 2017 Matt Cohen Award (winner)

References

External links
Diane Schoemperlen's entry in The Canadian Encyclopedia
 Dianne Schoemperlen at Random House

1954 births
Living people
20th-century Canadian novelists
21st-century Canadian novelists
Writers from Thunder Bay
Canadian women novelists
Governor General's Award-winning fiction writers
Lakehead University alumni
Canadian women short story writers
20th-century Canadian women writers
21st-century Canadian women writers
20th-century Canadian short story writers
21st-century Canadian short story writers